Amsterdam Airport Schiphol , known informally as Schiphol Airport, is the main international airport of the Netherlands. It is the world's third busiest airport by international passenger traffic in 2021. With almost 72 million passengers in 2019, it is the third-busiest airport in Europe in terms of passenger volume and the busiest in Europe in terms of aircraft movements. With an annual cargo tonnage of 1.74 million, it is the 4th busiest in Europe. The airport is built on the single-terminal concept: one large terminal split into three departure halls.

Schiphol is the hub for KLM and its regional affiliate KLM Cityhopper as well as for Corendon Dutch Airlines, Martinair, Transavia and TUI fly Netherlands. The airport also serves as a base for EasyJet.

Schiphol opened on 16 September 1916 as a military airbase. The end of the First World War also saw the beginning of civilian use of Schiphol Airport and the airport eventually lost its military role completely. By 1940, Schiphol had four asphalt runways at 45-degree angles. The airport was captured by the German military that same year and renamed Fliegerhorst Schiphol. The airport was destroyed through bombing but at the end of the war, the airfield was soon rebuilt. In 1949, it was decided that Schiphol was to become the primary airport of the Netherlands. Schiphol Airport was voted the Best Airport in Western Europe in 2020.

Etymology
According to the airport's media department, the name of Schiphol originated in the 15th century. In the Gothic language, it indicated an area of low lying wetland ("hol" or "holl") where wood (scip) could be extracted. However, Gothic has never been spoken in the Netherlands.

Description
Schiphol Airport ranked as Europe's third busiest and the world's eleventh busiest by total passenger traffic in 2017 (12th in 2016, 14th in 2015, 2014 and 2013 and 16th in 2012). It also ranks as the world's fifth busiest by international passenger traffic and the world's sixteenth busiest for cargo tonnage. A record 71,706,999 passengers passed through the airport in 2019. Schiphol's main competitors in terms of passenger traffic and cargo throughput are London-Heathrow, Frankfurt, Madrid, Paris–Charles de Gaulle and Istanbul.
In 2019, 70.5% of passengers using the airport flew to and from Europe, 10.6% to and from North America and 10.1% to and from Asia; cargo volume was mainly between Schiphol and Asia (46.3%) and North America (17.6%). In 2019, 102 carriers provided a total of 332 destinations on a regular basis.

The airport is built as one large terminal (a single-terminal concept), split into three departure halls, which connect again once airside. The most recent of these was completed in 1994 and expanded in 2007 with a new section, called Terminal 4, although it is not considered a separate building. A new pier is to be opened in 2019 with a terminal extension planned to be operational by 2023. Plans for further terminal and gate expansion exist, including the construction of a separate new terminal between the Zwanenburgbaan and Polderbaan runways that would end the one-terminal concept.

Because of intense traffic and high landing fees (due to the limit of 500,000 flights a year), some low-cost carriers decided to move their flights to smaller airports, such as Rotterdam The Hague Airport and Eindhoven Airport. Many low-cost carriers, such as EasyJet and Ryanair, however, continue to operate at Schiphol, using the low-cost H pier. Lelystad Airport is currently being expanded aimed at accommodating some of the low-cost and leisure flights currently operating out of Schiphol, eventually taking up to 45,000 flights a year.

History

Early years

Before 1852, the entire polder of Haarlemmermeer in which the airport lies was a large lake with some shallow areas. There are multiple stories of how the place got its name. The most popular story is that in the shallow waters sudden violent storms could claim many ships. Winds were particularly strong in the Schiphol area since the prevailing wind direction is from the south-west, and Schiphol lies in the north-eastern corner of the lake. In English,  translates to 'ship hole', a reference to many ships supposedly lost in the lake. When the lake was reclaimed, however, no shipwrecks were found. Another possible origin of the name is the word . A  is a ditch or small canal in which ships would be towed from one lake to another. A third explanation would be that the name derived from the words . This is a low-lying area of land from where wood would be obtained to build ships.

After the lake was dredged in the mid-1800s, a fortification named Fort Schiphol was built in the area which was part of the Stelling van Amsterdam defence works.

Schiphol opened on 16 September 1916 as a military airbase, with a few barracks and a field serving as platform and runways. When civil aircraft started to use the field (17 December 1920), it was often called . The Fokker aircraft manufacturer started a factory near Schiphol airport in 1919. The end of the First World War also saw the beginning of civilian use of Schiphol Airport and the airport eventually lost its military role completely.

By 1940, Schiphol had four asphalt runways at 45-degree angles, all  or less. The airport was captured by the German military that same year and renamed . A large number of anti-aircraft defences were installed in the vicinity of the airport and fake decoy airfields were constructed in the vicinity near Bennebroek, Vijfhuizen, and Vogelenzang to try to confuse Allied bombers. A railway connection was also built. Despite these defences, the airfield was still bombed intensively; an exceptionally heavy attack on 13 December 1943 caused so much damage that it rendered the airfield unusable as an active base. After that, it served only as an emergency landing field, until the Germans themselves destroyed the remnants of the airfield at the start of Operation Market Garden. At the end of the war, the airfield was quickly restored: the first aircraft, a Douglas DC-3, landed on 8 July 1945.

A new terminal building was completed in 1949 and it was decided that Schiphol was to become the primary airport of the Netherlands. The expansion came at the cost of a small town called Rijk, which was demolished to make room for the growing airport. The name of this town is remembered in the name of the present Schiphol-Rijk industrial estate. In 1967, Schiphol expanded even further with a new terminal area at its current location. Most of the 1967 terminal is still in use today (Departure Halls 1 and 2) as are parts of the original piers (now called C, D, and E). Dutch designer Benno Wissing created signage for Schiphol Airport, well known for its clear writing and thorough colour-coding; to avoid confusion, he prohibited any other signage in the shades of yellow and green used. The new terminal building replaced the older facilities once located on what is now the east side of the airport. The A-Pier (now C-pier) of the airport was modified in 1970 to allow Boeing 747 aircraft to use the boarding gates. A new pier (D, now called F) opened in 1977, dedicated to handling wide-body aircraft. The first railway station at the airport followed in 1978.

Development since the 1990s

The construction of a new Air Traffic Control tower was completed in 1991 as the existing tower could no longer oversee all of the airport as it was further expanded. Departure Hall 3 was added to the terminal in 1993, as was another pier, G-pier. New wayfinding signage was designed that year as well by Paul Mijksenaar. A sixth runway was completed at quite some distance west of the rest of airport in 2003 and was nicknamed the Polderbaan, with the connecting taxiway bridge crossing the A5 motorway. The distance of this runway means that taxi times to and from this runway can take between 10 and 20 minutes. It also required the construction of an additional Air Traffic Control tower as the primary tower is too far away to oversee this part of the airfield.

On 25 February 2005, a diamond robbery occurred at Schiphol's cargo terminal. The robbers used a stolen KLM van to gain airside access. The estimated value of the stones was around 75 million euros, making it one of the largest diamond robberies ever.

Later in 2005, a fire broke out at the airport's detention centre, killing 11 people and injuring 15. The complex was holding 350 people at the time of the incident.
Results from the investigation almost one year later showed that fire safety precautions were not in force. A national outrage resulted in the resignation of Justice Minister Piet Hein Donner (CDA) and Mayor Hartog of Haarlemmermeer. Spatial Planning Minister Sybilla Dekker (VVD) resigned as well, because she bore responsibility for safety failings cited in the report.

In Summer 2022, the airport suffered the impact of the COVID-19 pandemic on aviation. It experienced extraordinary long delays and a large number of cancelled flights, which led to recession of air traffic and subsequently to the shortage of security staff and walkout of baggage handlers. Queues for security check in were reported to last for 5 hours, and many passengers missed their flights. The CEO of Schiphol Group, Dick Benschop, was forced to resign.

Infrastructure

Terminal

Schiphol uses a one-terminal concept, where all facilities are located under a single roof, radiating from the central plaza, Schiphol Plaza. The terminal is divided into three sections or halls designated 1, 2 and 3. The piers and concourses of each hall are connected so that it is possible, on both sides of security or border inspection, to walk between piers and halls, although border control separates Schengen from non-Schengen areas. The exception to this is the low-cost pier M: once airside (past security), passengers cannot access any other areas.

Schiphol Airport has approximately 223 boarding gates including eighteen double jetway gates used for widebody aircraft. The airport adopted a distinctive design, with the second jetway extending over the aircraft wing hanging from a steel cantilever structure. Recent refurbishments have seen most of these jetways being replaced with a more conventional layout. Two gates feature a third jetway for handling of the Airbus A380. Emirates was the first airline to fly the A380 to Schiphol in August 2012, deploying the aircraft on its double daily Dubai–Amsterdam service. During the summer, China Southern Airlines also uses the A380 on its Beijing–Amsterdam route.

Schiphol has large shopping areas as a source of revenue and as an additional attraction for passengers. Schiphol Plaza not only connects the three terminal halls but also houses other facilities. This is a large pre-security shopping centre and the Schiphol Airport railway station. These facilities are also attracting general visitors.

Notable public artworks in the airport include the Schiphol clock by Maarten Baas, in which a man behind a translucent screen appears to paint the minutes of an analog clock by hand.

Departure Hall 1
Departure Hall 1 consists of Piers B and C, both of which are dedicated Schengen areas and shares D-pier with Departure hall 2. Pier B has 14 gates and Pier C has 21 gates.

Departure Hall 2
Departure Hall 2 consists of Piers D and E.

Pier D is the largest pier and has two levels. The lower floor houses non-Schengen flights and the upper floor is used for Schengen flights. By using stairs, the same jetways are used to access the aircraft. Schengen gates are numbered beginning with D-59; non-Schengen gates are numbered from D-1 to D-57.

Pier E is a dedicated non-Schengen area and has 14 gates. It is typically home to SkyTeam hub airlines Delta Air Lines and KLM, along with other members, such as China Airlines and China Southern Airlines. Other Middle Eastern and Asian airlines such as Air Astana, EVA Air, Etihad Airways and Iran Air also typically operate out of Pier E.

Departure Hall 3
Departure Hall 3 consists of three piers: F, G, and H/M. Pier F has 8 gates and is typically dominated by SkyTeam members such as primary airline KLM, Kenya Airways, China Airlines and China Southern Airlines, and other members. Pier G has 13 gates. Piers F and G are non-Schengen areas.

Piers H and M are physically one concourse consisting of 7 shared gates and are home to low-cost airlines. Operating completely separately, H handles non-Schengen flights while M is dedicated to flights within the Schengen area.

A380
Gates G9, E18 and E24 (E24 refurbished in 2019) are equipped to handle daily Airbus A380 service by Emirates and China Southern Airlines.

General aviation terminal
A new general aviation terminal was opened in 2011 on the east side of the airport, operated as the KLM Jet Center.

Other facilities
The Rijksmuseum operates an annex at the airport, offering a small overview of both classical and contemporary art. Admission to the exhibits is free.

In summer 2010, Schiphol Airport Library opened alongside the museum, providing passengers access to a collection of 1,200 books (translated into 29 languages) by Dutch authors on subjects relating to the country's history and culture. The  library offers e-books and music by Dutch artists and composers that can be downloaded free of charge to a laptop or mobile device.

For aviation enthusiasts, Amsterdam Airport Schiphol has a large rooftop viewing area, called the Panoramaterras. It is not accessible to connecting passengers unless they first exit the airport. Enthusiasts and the public can enter, free of charge, from the airport's landside. Since June 2011, it is the location for a KLM Cityhopper Fokker 100, modified to be a viewing exhibit. Besides the Panoramaterras, Schiphol has other spotting sites, especially along the newest Polderbaan runway and at the McDonald's restaurant at the north side of the airport.

Schiphol has its own mortuary, where the dead can be handled and kept before departure or after arrival. Since October 2006, people can also hold a wedding ceremony at Schiphol.

Schiphol also has a new state-of-the-art cube-shaped Hilton Amsterdam Airport Schiphol with 433 rooms, rounded corners and diamond-shaped windows. The spacious atrium has a  ceiling made of glass and is in the heart of the building. A covered walkway connects the hotel directly to the terminal. The hotel was completed in 2015.

Future expansions

Pier A
In 2012, Schiphol Group announced an expansion of Schiphol, featuring a new pier. Pier A will be part of Departure Hall 1, which already has Pier B (14 gates) and Pier C (21 gates). The new Pier A will have 5 narrow-body gates and will initially have 3 wide-body gates, with two more planned for a later phase. The first activities are expected to start in 2017 and to be completed in 2023. The expansions will cost about 500 million euros.

First, the new Pier A will be built to the southwest of Pier B, in an area currently used as a freight platform. Pier A will mainly be used for flights within Europe.

Originally expected to be operational by the end of 2019, the construction of the new pier has been delayed several times and due to a conflict between the airport and the construction consortium the construction was halted in November 2021. Schiphol was disappointed in the construction speed and the rising of the total cost, although insiders announced that a design flaw was made and the entire construction needed to be reinforced. A new tendering procedure will be started to find a new constructor, once found a new completion date will be announced.

Fourth terminal
To handle future growth in passengers, Schiphol will further expand the terminal and build a fourth terminal with facilities for both departures and arrivals. From this new building, direct access will be made to Schiphol Plaza, continuing the one-terminal concept. When finished in 2023, Schiphol will be able to handle over 70 million passengers. Due to rapid growth of Schengen passengers during 2016, Schiphol was however forced to rapidly build a temporary departure hall which opened in March 2017. Due to the ongoing COVID-19 pandemic the construction of the fourth terminal has been postponed for at least two years.

Uniform platform
The airport has expended the number of uniform platforms, places to stow airplanes, in the past years in two phases. A third phase is planned to extend the number of wide-body platforms to a total of 12, with a planned completion in the period 2022–2026.

Public transportation
Schiphol, together with the public transport authority Amsterdam, is going to transform its train- and bus station. The train station will be getting more entrances and the bus station will be completely renewed with a planned opening date in 2025. A connection to the Amsterdam Metro network has been a subject of discussion and speculation since at least the 1990s. In preparation for this, a piece of land has been acquired from Chipshol. , the project hadn't moved past the proposal stage.

Airlines

Schiphol's growth is hampered by slot restrictions from the government. For reasons of safety and noise reduction, Schiphol is allowed to have no more than 500,000 aircraft movements until the end of 2020. A proposal to increase the limit to 540,000 movements from 2021 onwards has been postponed until a new government is formed after the elections in March 2021. As Schiphol nearly approached the limit of 500,000 in the last few years, the slot restrictions have hindered airlines to settle at Schiphol. Among airlines that have expressed interest in flying at Schiphol are Atlantic Airways, JetBlue, Somon Air and SpiceJet.

Tower
Schiphol is geographically one of the world's lowest major commercial airports. The entire airport is below sea level.

Runways

Schiphol has six runways, one of which is used mainly by general aviation. The airport covers a total area of 6,887 acres (2,787 ha) of land.

Airlines and destinations

Passenger

Cargo

Other users
Other regular users of Schiphol are the Netherlands Coastguard whose aircraft are operated by the Royal Netherlands Air Force, the Dienst Luchtvaart Politie and the Dutch Dakota Association.

Peak moments
The peak moment for arrivals is between 8 a.m. and 9 a.m. (with up to 52 arrivals on a weekday).

Statistics

Other facilities

The TransPort Building on the Schiphol Airport property houses the head offices of Martinair and transavia. Construction of the building, which has  of rentable space, began on 17 March 2009. Schiphol Group and the architect firm Paul de Ruiter designed the building, while De Vries and Verburg, a firm of Stolwijk, constructed the building.

The World Trade Center Schiphol Airport houses the head office of SkyTeam, the Netherlands office of China Southern Airlines, and the Netherlands offices of Iran Air. The head office of Schiphol Group, the airport's operator, is located on the airport property. The Convair Building, with its development beginning after a parcel was earmarked for its development in 1999, houses KLM offices, including KLM Recruitment Services and the head office of KLM Cityhopper. The original control tower of Schiphol Airport, which the airport authorities had moved slightly from its original location, now houses a restaurant. The area Schiphol-Rijk includes the head office of TUI fly Netherlands.

At one time, KLM had its head office briefly on the grounds of Schiphol Airport. Its current head office in nearby Amstelveen had a scheduled completion at the end of 1970. Previously Martinair had its head office in the Schiphol Center at Schiphol Airport. Formerly, the head office of Transavia was in the Building Triport III at Schiphol Airport. NLM Cityhopper and later KLM Cityhopper previously had their head offices in Schiphol Airport building 70.

Nippon Cargo Airlines has its Europe regional headquarters at Schiphol. The National Aerospace Museum Aviodome–Schiphol was previously located at Schiphol. In 2003, the museum moved to Lelystad Airport and was renamed the "Aviodrome."

Ground transport

Rail

The Nederlandse Spoorwegen (NS), the national Dutch train operator, has a major passenger railway station directly underneath the passenger terminal complex that offers transportation 24 hours a day into the four major cities Amsterdam, Utrecht, The Hague and Rotterdam. There are efficient and often direct services to many other cities in the country. There are intercity connections to Almere, Lelystad, Amsterdam Centraal, Utrecht Centraal, both The Hague Centraal and The Hague HS, Rotterdam Centraal, Eindhoven, 's-Hertogenbosch, Leeuwarden, Groningen, Amersfoort Centraal, Apeldoorn, Deventer, Enschede, Arnhem Centraal, Nijmegen and Venlo. Schiphol is also a stop for the Thalys international high-speed train, connecting the airport directly to Antwerp, Brussels and Paris Gare du Nord, as well as to Bourg St Maurice (winter) and Marseille (summer). The Intercity-Brussel (also named "beneluxtrein") to Antwerp and Brussels stops at the airport.

Bus
Amsterdam Airport Schiphol is also easily accessible by bus, as many services call or terminate at the bus station located outside in front of the terminal building.

The Taiwanese EVA Air provides private bus services from Schiphol to Belgium for its Belgium-based customers. The service, which departs from and arrives at bus stop C11, goes to Saint-Gilles, Brussels (near the Brussels-South (Midi) railway station) and Berchem, Antwerp (near Antwerp-Berchem bus station). The service is co-operated with Reizen Lauwers NV.

Road
Schiphol Airport can easily be reached by car via the A4 and A9 motorways.

While most roads leading to the airport are forbidden for bicycles, it is possible to reach the airport by bicycle via bicycle paths.

Accidents and incidents

On 14 November 1946, a Douglas C-47 operated by KLM from London approached Schiphol during bad weather conditions. The first two attempts to land failed. During the third attempt, the pilot realized that the airplane was not lined up properly with the runway. The aircraft made a sharp left turn at low speed, causing the left wing to hit the ground. The airplane crashed and caught fire, killing all 26 people on board.
On 4 October 1992, El Al Flight 1862, a Boeing 747-200F cargo jet en route to Tel Aviv, lost both right-wing engines (#3 and #4) just after taking off from Schiphol and crashed into an apartment building in the Bijlmer neighbourhood of Amsterdam while attempting to return to the airport. A total of 47 people were killed, including the plane's crew of three and a non-revenue passenger. In addition to these fatalities, 11 persons were seriously injured and 15 persons received minor injuries.
On 4 April 1994, KLM Cityhopper Flight 433, a Saab 340 to Cardiff, returned to Schiphol after setting the number two engine to flight idle because the crew mistakenly believed that the engine suffered from low oil pressure because of a faulty warning light. The airplane rolled to the right, pitched up, stalled and hit the ground at 80 degrees bank. Of the twenty-four people on board, three were killed, including the captain. Nine others were seriously injured.
On 25 February 2009, Turkish Airlines Flight 1951, a Boeing 737-800 from Istanbul crashed on approach, just  short of the airport's Polderbaan runway. The plane carried 128 passengers and 7 crew on board. 9 people were killed and a further 86 were injured, including six with serious injuries. Four of the dead were employees of Boeing, involved in an advanced radar deal with Turkey. An initial report from the Dutch Safety Board revealed that the left radio altimeter had failed to provide the correct height above the ground and suddenly reported . As a result of this the autothrottle system closed the thrust levers to idle, as it is programmed to reduce thrust when below  radio altitude. This eventually resulted in a dropping airspeed that was not acted upon until it was too late to recover, and the aircraft stalled and crashed in a field.
On 23 February 2017, a Bombardier Dash-8 Q400 operated by Flybe suffered a collapse of its right landing gear after landing at the Oostbaan. The plane took off from Edinburgh after a 1.5-hour delay and had to battle storm Doris throughout the flight and during landing. None of the 59 passengers and 4 crew was injured in the incident, but the aircraft sustained significant damage.

See also

 Hello Goodbye (TV series)
 List of busiest passenger air routes
 Transport in the Netherlands

Notes

References

Citations

General and cited reference

 Heuvel, Coen van den (1992). Schiphol, een Wereldluchthaven in Beeld. Holkema & Warendorf. .

External links

 Official website
 Fire Brigade Amsterdam Airport Schiphol

1916 establishments in the Netherlands
Airports established in 1916
Airports in North Holland
Haarlemmermeer
Transport in Amsterdam
International airports in the Netherlands
20th-century architecture in the Netherlands